Ziridava dysorga is a moth in the family Geometridae. It is found on Samoa and the Cook Islands.

References

Moths described in 1928
Eupitheciini